Zilch Cliffs is a series of steep cliffs that mark the east extremity of McDonald Heights near the coast of Marie Byrd Land. The cliffs were photographed from aircraft of United States Antarctic Service (USAS), 1939–41, and were mapped in detail from U.S. Navy air photos and United States Geological Survey (USGS) surveys, 1959–65. Named by Advisory Committee on Antarctic Names (US-ACAN) for Lieutenant Commander C.H. Zilch, U.S. Navy, Officer-in-Charge of the meteorological support unit during Operation Deep Freeze 1966.

References 

Cliffs of Marie Byrd Land